The Kamchadals inhabit  Kamchatka, Russia. The name "Kamchadal" was applied to the descendants of the local Siberians and aboriginal peoples (the Itelmens, Ainu, Koryaks and Chuvans) who assimilated with the Russians. The descendants of the mixed-blood Russian settlers in 18th-19th century are called Kamchadals these days. The Kamchadals speak Russian with a touch of local dialects of the aboriginal languages of Kamchatka. The Kamchadals engage in fur trading, fishing, market gardening and dairy farming, and are of the Russian Orthodox faith. The Kamchadal language was a Kamchatka  creole with Russian and indigenous elements.

History
In 1767 and 1768, a Russian ship brought smallpox to the region for the first time, and it is believed to have killed three fourths of the native population. In the journal of Captain James Cook, "The  small  pox  .  .  .  made  its  appearance  in  1767 and  1768. It  was  brought  into  the  country  by  a  Russian  vessel  bound  to  the  Eastern  islands,  for  the  purpose  of  hunting  otters,  foxes,  and  other  animals. The  person  who  had  in  his  blood  the  fatal  germ  was  a  sailor  from  Okotsk (sic),  where  he  had  taken remedies  for  the  disorder  previous  to  his  departure;  but  the  recent  marks  of  it  were  visible. So, Kamchadals as an ethnic group were not numerous after this contact with fur traders. 

As a result of the Treaty of Saint Petersburg (1875), the Kuril Islands were handed over to Japan, along with its Ainu subjects. A total of 83 North Kuril Ainu arrived in Petropavlovsk-Kamchatsky on September 18, 1877 after they decided to remain under Russian rule. They refused the offer by Russian officials to move to new reservations in the Commander Islands. Finally a deal was reached in 1881 and the Ainu decided to settle in the village of Yavin, Kamchatka. In March 1881 the group left Petropavlovsk and started the journey towards Yavin by foot. Four months later, they arrived at their new homes. Another village, Golygino was founded later. Under Soviet rule, both the villages were forced to disband and residents were moved to the Russian dominated Zaporozhye rural settlement in Ust-Bolsheretsky Raion. As a result of intermarriage, the three ethnic groups assimilated to form the Kamchadal community.

According to Alexei Nakamura, Kurile Kamchadals along with Ainu living in Russia are fighting for official recognition. Since the Ainu are not recognized in the official list of the peoples living in Russia, some of them are counted as ethnic Kamchadals.

See also
Indigenous small-numbered peoples of the North, Siberia and the Far East
Ainu in Russia

References

Russian sub-ethnic groups
Social groups of Russia
Ethnic groups in Siberia
Kamchatka Krai